The 811th Cadet Squadron is one of the few remaining School Enrichment Program (SEP) Cadet Squadrons in Civil Air Patrol. It acts as a regular squadron, yet has a partnership with an in school elective class that is offered to students at the middle school, who do not need to be members to participate. New Mexico SEP programs are funded from the New Mexico Department of Military Affairs to pay in class instructors to teach the elective leadership/aerospace courses across the state. The 811th is also the lead squadron in the nation for developing and maintaining balloon operations and expanding the scope in which the program runs.  The 811th is assigned to Group 800 as its echelon command. The 811th's Cadet Commander is C/CMsgt Eliana Armstrong and the Squadron Commander is Major Jessica Makin.

History

811th St Therese Cadet Squadron

The 811th was originally chartered and garrisoned at the St Therese Catholic School in Albuquerque, New Mexico, as a school enrichment program. This offered students within the school to participate in Civil Air Patrol five days a week. At this time the major concentrations of the squadron were that of color guard and drill.

811th LBJ Middle School Cadet Squadron
 

In July 2010 the 811th transferred to the LBJ Middle School from St Therese. Major Ben Noyce transferred the unit and simultaneously had classes conducted at the school. The original approach of having all youth that attended the in-school program also be cadet members in Civil Air Patrol was abandoned and it opened students to attend the STEM based in school class without having to commit to the traditional Civil Air Patrol Squadron and membership. This helped advance STEM and aviation into the school and garner interest in careers and institutions based in aviation.
In November 2013, Lieutenant Colonel William Fitzpatrick, took over the squadron as the squadron commander. Immediately the focus, goals, mission and vision of the 811th changed substantially. Moving from a drill and ceremonies focused squadron, the 811th refocused on flight training, operational management, and aviation advocating. In 2014 the 811th received a Unit Citation for its contribution for standing up balloon operations and writing regulations for its integration at the national level.

Hot Air Balloon Operations

In October 2013, New Mexico Sunrise hit power lines, sending both the pilot and the crew chief to the hospital. After the accident, Mark Kilgore, the pilot and owner of the balloon donated it to the New Mexico Wing of Civil Air Patrol to develop a balloon program. The aircraft had been repaired and returned to air worthiness. At the time Major Ben Noyce spearheaded the acquisition of New Mexico Sunrise and renamed the aircraft Phoenix, since it had arisen from its own ashes to find a new purpose. Through intensive recruiting, the 811th gained three balloon pilots to help develop the balloon program. Captain Al Lowenstein as the Chief Pilot and Captain Jessica Makin, both became the first cadre and check pilots. The addition of Captain Will Manus brought the instructors up to three. The program began with an intense Chase Crew training program, which graduated over 40 members in the first 6 months. On the 25th of January, Major Ben Noyce was the first Civil Air Patrol member to receive his private pilot certificate solely through a Civil Air Patrol Balloon Flight Program.  With crews trained, 811th members, furnishing member-owned aircraft flew a young 9-year old who is going blind, whose wish was to fly in a hot air balloon.

The 811th realizing that the program could not be sustained unless they trained new pilots started to develop a full flight training program where five members, three senior members and two cadet members, began intensive initial flight training. Partnered with the local balloon community, the 811th provided chase crews and its own balloon to local rallies and events. Daniel Lovato, who was the crew chief for New Mexico Sunrise, was the other individual that was severely injured in the accident prior to CAP gaining the aircraft. In February 2015, Captain Lowenstein of the 811th flew Daniel Lovato for the first time after the accident in the same aircraft.

In June 2016, the balloon Phoenix was retired when it could no longer pass its annual airworthiness inspection. In the 18 months of operating with New Mexico Wing and starting the New Mexico Balloon Program, it produced five lighter than air pilots. Since Phoenix was retired, there was a need to find a replacement to continue the program. In October 2016, an order was placed with Lindstrand Balloons USA to build a custom envelope to replace the retired envelope of Phoenix.
On December 27, 2016; New Mexico Wing took delivery of a ninety thousand cubic foot Lindstrand 90A Envelope named Integrity. Integrity Flew its first flight 8 January 8, 2016.
Integrity has now participated in two Air Ventures in Oshkosh, Wisconsin and three Albuquerque International Balloon Fiestas. Integrity has exposed nearly 5 million people to Civil Air Patrol Balloon Operations while taking part in these events.

First Cadet Lighter than Air Private Pilot in Southwest Region

On February 26, 2016, the first cadet to attain her private pilot certificate for a hot air balloon within the Southwest Region of Civil Air Patrol. Lighter than Air training has been talked about within the organization for a few decades but documentation of completion is slim to none known. Cadet Blankley started her training in the summer of 2015, after completing her private pilot certificate in gliders.

First Spaatz Award Recipient
Cadet Colonel Destiny Maurer was the 2200 Cadet in the United States to receive her Spaatz Award. Earned on 7 August 2018, she is the first cadet in the 811th Cadet Squadron to receive the Spaatz Award and the 26th in the State of New Mexico.

Awards
New Mexico Wing School Enrichment Program Squadron of the Year 2009
Aerospace Excellence Award 2011–2012
Unit Citation – 1 October 2013 to 30 September 2014
New Mexico Wing School Enrichment Program Squadron of the Year 2014
Aerospace Excellence Award 2014–2015
New Mexico Wing School Enrichment Program Squadron of the Year 2015
Unit Citation – 1 November 2014 to 29 December 2015
Quality Cadet Unit Award 2016
New Mexico Wing School Enrichment Program Squadron of the Year 2016
Aircraft finds in support of EAA Airventure 2017 (Two finds)
Aerospace Excellence Award 2016–2017
Quality Cadet Unit Award 2017
New Mexico Wing School Enrichment Program Squadron of the Year 2017
New Mexico Wing Squadron of the Year 2017
Aerospace Excellence Award 2017-2018
Quality Cadet Unit Award 2018
New Mexico Wing School Enrichment Program Squadron of the Year 2018
Aerospace Excellence Award 2018-2019
Quality Cadet Unit Award 2019
New Mexico Wing School Enrichment Program Squadron of the Year 2019
Aerospace Excellence Award 2019-2020
Quality Cadet Unit Award 2020

Lineage

 Chartered 811th St Therese Cadet Squadron, 3 June 2008
 Re-designated: 811th LBJ Middle School Cadet Squadron, July 2010

References 

  November 2, 2009 NM Color Guard Competition
  February 17, 2015  Balloon pilot turns tragedy into inspiration
   July 21, 2014  N.M. Wing launches ballooning program
  July 14, 2014 N.M. Wing launches ballooning program
  811th Civil Air Patrol Cadet Squadron-doing well to do good!
  by Lee Ross Nucleus managing editor 7/18/2014 – KIRTLAND AIR FORCE BASE, N.M
  11:14 PM MDT Jul 13, 2014 KOAT ABC
  February 27, 2015 By Master Sgt. Paula Aragon, Civil Air Patrol balloon rises like a Phoenix to teach cadets about flight
  Joline Gutierrez Krueger / Journal Wednesday, February 11, 2015 at 12:02 am Balloon crash survivor sets sights on the sky
  Group 800, New Mexico Wing, Press releases
  2015 Albuquerque International Balloon Fiesta Sponsors
  Up UP and away, July 17, 2014, Kirtland AFB Nucleus
  A Vision Quest in Albuquerque, New Mexico posted June 2, 2014, 12:19 PM by Ben Noyce
  Boy's wish to see ABQ fulfilled before going blind By Crystal Gutierrez Published: June 1, 2014, 9:00 am  |  Updated: June 1, 2014, 3:14 pm
  CAP lends a hand at spaceport
  Balloon hits Rio Rancho power line, two burned

External links 
 Official New Mexico Civil Air Patrol website

New Mexico
Civil Air Patrol
Civil Air Patrol
Civil Air Patrol
Civil Air Patrol